Xinfeng County (postal: Sunfung or Sinfeng) is a county in the northeast of Guangdong Province, China. It is the southernmost county-level division of the prefecture-level city of Shaoguan.

Climate

References

County-level divisions of Guangdong
Shaoguan